Nadine Härdter (born 29 March 1981) is a German handball player. She plays for the club Thüringer HC and for the German national team.

She represented Germany at the 2008 Summer Olympic Games in Beijing, where the German team  finished 11th. She participated at the 2009 World Women's Handball Championship in China.

References

1981 births
Living people
German female handball players
Handball players at the 2008 Summer Olympics
Olympic handball players of Germany